The Butt Report, released on 18 August 1941, was a report prepared during World War II, revealing the widespread failure of RAF Bomber Command aircraft to hit their targets.

At the start of the war, Bomber Command had no real means of determining the success of its operations. Crews would return with only their word as to the amount of damage caused or even if they had bombed the target. The Air Ministry demanded that a method of verifying these claims be developed and by 1941 cameras mounted under bombers, triggered by the bomb release, were being fitted.

Contents
The report was initiated by Lord Cherwell, a friend of Churchill and chief scientific advisor to the Cabinet. David Bensusan-Butt, a civil servant in the War Cabinet Secretariat and an assistant of Cherwell, was given the task of assessing 633 target photos and comparing them with crews' claims. The results, first circulated on 18 August 1941, were a shock to many, though not necessarily to those within the RAF, who knew the difficulty of night navigation and target finding.

Postwar studies confirmed Butt's assessment, showing that 49% of Bomber Command bombs dropped between May 1940 and May 1941 fell in open country. As Butt did not include those aircraft that did not bomb because of equipment failure, enemy action, weather or which failed to find the target, only about 5% of bombers setting out bombed within  of the target.

Contemporary debate, dehousing and Singleton Report

The truth about the failure of Bomber Command shook everyone. Senior RAF commanders argued that the Butt report's statistics were faulty and commissioned another report, which was delivered by the Directorate of Bombing Operations on 22 September 1941; extrapolating from an analysis of the bomb damage inflicted on British cities, it calculated that the RAF could destroy the forty-three German towns with a population of more than 100,000 using a force of 4,000 bombers. The Chief of the Air Staff, Sir Charles Portal, argued that with such a force Bomber Command could win the war in six months. Not all were convinced and when Churchill expressed his doubts, the Air Staff retrenched and said that even if it did not knock Germany out of the war, it would weaken them sufficiently to allow British armed forces back into Europe.  With this compromise between the armed services, Bomber Command was allowed to keep its planned allocation of materiel. This did not stop those outside the Chiefs of Staff questioning the strategic bombing policy.

A particularly damning speech had been delivered in the House of Commons by the Member of Parliament for the University of Cambridge, Professor A. V. Hill—the noted research scientist and previously a member of the committee that had sponsored research into radar. His speech pointed out that

In response to the concerns raised by the Butt report, Cherwell produced his dehousing paper (first circulated on 30 March 1942), which proposed that by area bombing instead of futile attempts at precision bombing the deficiencies of the RAF could be mitigated. The Secretary of State for Air, Sir Archibald Sinclair and Sir Charles Portal were delighted by the paper as it offered support to them in their battle to save the strategic bomber offensive, which had been under attack from others in the high command who thought that the resources put into Bomber Command were damaging the other branches of the armed services, with little to show for it.

On reading the dehousing paper, Professor Patrick Blackett, the chief scientist to the Royal Navy, said that the paper's estimate of what could be achieved was 600 percent too high. The principal advocate for the reduction of Bomber Command in favour of other options was Sir Henry Tizard. He argued that the only benefit to strategic bombing was that it tied up enemy resources defending Germany but that those forces could be tied up with a far smaller bombing offensive. He wrote to Cherwell on 15 April querying the figures in the paper and warning that the War Cabinet could reach the wrong decision if they based their decision on it. His criticism of the paper was that experience suggested that only 7,000 bombers would be delivered rather than the 10,000 in the paper, and since only 25 percent of the bombs were likely to land on target the total dropped would be no more than 50,000, so the strategy would not work with the resources available.

Mr. Justice Singleton, a High Court Judge, was asked by the Cabinet to look into the competing points of view. In his report delivered on 20 May 1942, he concluded that

In the end, thanks in part to the dehousing paper, it was this view which prevailed but C. P. Snow (later Lord Snow) wrote that the debate became quite vitriolic with Tizard being called a defeatist. It was while this debate about bombing was raging inside the British military establishment that the area bombing directive of 14 February 1942 was issued; eight days later Arthur "Bomber" Harris took up the post of Air Officer Commanding-in-Chief (AOC-in-C) of Bomber Command.

Aftermath
As the war progressed, RAF Bomber Command improved its methods. Electronic navigational instruments like GEE, Oboe, G-H and the ground-mapping radar codenamed H2S all helped to improve bombing accuracy. Improvement in tactics such as the development of the Pathfinder Force, created against Harris's wishes, also improved bombing accuracy. By 1945, No. 5 Group RAF could sector-bomb in a fan-shaped pattern that maximised the coverage and effect of incendiary bombs. To create this effect, the run of a bomber was timed and calculated to fan out from a bomb aiming point, as was done in the bombing of Dresden in February 1945, when the aiming point was the Ostragehege soccer stadium, easily identifiable with H2S.

Notes

References

Further reading
 CABINET PAPERS:  Complete classes from the CAB & PREM series in the Public Record Office Series One: PREM 3 - Papers concerning Defence & Operational Subjects, 1940-1945 Winston Churchill, Minister of Defence, Secretariat Papers
 Butt Report Summary Transcript
 Reference to the Butt Report at The National Archives

1941 documents
History of the Royal Air Force during World War II